A triple conjunction is an astronomical event when two planets or a planet and a star appear to meet each other three times during a brief period, either in opposition or at the time of inferior conjunction, if an inferior planet is involved. The visible movement of the planet or the planets in the sky appears therefore normally prograde at the first conjunction, retrograde at the second conjunction, and again prograde at the third conjunction.

The lining-up of three planets is a particular case of syzygy.

There are three possible cases of triple conjunctions.

Of inferior planets with superior planets or stars 

If Mars is in conjunction with the Sun, there is often a triple conjunction between Mars and Mercury or between Mars and Venus. In the events in which Mercury is involved, the second conjunction is invisible because of small elongation from Sun; both other events are difficult to see because of the nearness to horizon and the relatively low brightness of Mars, which is there always near its greatest distance from Earth, barely visible.

For a Mars–Venus triple conjunction all three events can almost always be seen, but Mars is dim because of its great distance from the Earth.

Triple conjunctions between the inferior planets Mercury and Venus and the superior planets Jupiter, Saturn, Uranus, Neptune, dwarf planet Pluto or with stars take place when these objects are at the same time in conjunction to Sun while Mercury or Venus are at inferior conjunction.
Frequently the second conjunction takes place when both bodies are too close to the Sun in order to be seen, while the other conjunctions are easily visible, especially if the other body is Jupiter, Saturn or a bright star.

With the dim planets Uranus, Neptune and dwarf planet Pluto the visibility of such an event is difficult, because of the low elongation from Sun.

Triple conjunctions of Mercury and Venus with the exterior planets Jupiter, Saturn, Uranus, Neptune, and dwarf planet Pluto happen relatively frequently (approximately once in 10 years).

Between two exterior planets 

These are the most interesting triple conjunctions, because all three conjunctions can be seen very easily, because of the great elongation of the planets or stars involved. Triple conjunctions between exterior planets or an exterior planet and a star can only occur when these objects are nearly simultaneously in opposition.

Triple conjunctions between the bright exterior planets are very rare: the last triple conjunctions between Mars and Jupiter occurred in 1789–1790, in 1836–1837 and in 1979–1980. The next events of this kind will be again in 2123 and in 2169–2170.

The last triple conjunctions between Mars and Saturn took place in 1779, 1877 (only in right ascension) and in 1945–1946. The next triple conjunction between these planets will occur in 2148–2149, in 2185 and in 2187.

For both at triple conjunctions between Mars and Jupiter and for triple conjunctions between Mars and Saturn it is possible that two such events follow at an interval of only 2 years. This last happened for Mars and Jupiter in 927 and 929 and will be again in 2742 and 2744. It last happened for Mars and Saturn in 1742–1743 and 1744–1745 and will occur again in 2185 and 2187.

The most historically important triple conjunction was that one between Jupiter and Saturn in 7 BCE-5 BCE, which has been proposed as the explanation for the star of Bethlehem. Triple conjunctions between Jupiter and Saturn—so-called Greatest Conjunctions—last took place in 1682–1683, 1821 (only in right ascension), 1940–1941 and 1981. It will not occur again until 2238–2239.

There are more frequent triple conjunctions of Jupiter with Uranus or Neptune. They are unspectacular, but offer a good possibility for amateur astronomers to find these dim planets. The last triple conjunction between Jupiter and Uranus was in 2010–2011 and the next will be in 2037–2038. The last between Jupiter and Neptune was in 2009 and the next will be in 2047–2048.

At each opposition, because of the visible loop movement of the planets, there are triple conjunctions between the planet and some stars. Triple conjunctions between planets and bright stars close to the zodiac are not so frequent (approximately 2 events in 10 years).

Of the planets Mars, Jupiter, Saturn, Uranus, and Neptune in right ascension between 1800 and 2100

Of the planets Mars, Jupiter, Saturn, Uranus, and Neptune in ecliptic longitude between 1800 and 2100 

Note that conjunctions in right ascension and ecliptic longitude need not take place on the same date. It is possible that there is a triple conjunction in right ascension, but not in ecliptic longitude and vice versa.

Some triple conjunctions between 2100 and 3000

See also 
Celestial mechanics
Great conjunction
Positional astronomy

References

This text is a translation of the German Wikipedia article :de:Dreifache Konjunktion. Please update as needed.

Astrometry
Astrological aspects
Conjunctions (astronomy and astrology)